The Philippine National Guard was a militia that was created by the Philippine Assembly in 1917. It would serve under General John Pershing in Europe during World War I. The Philippine Legislature, led by Senate President Manuel Quezon, offered the United States some assistance during the World War I. It had 25,000 soldiers when it was absorbed by the National Army. The total cost of raising the unit was under three million dollars. This unit, however, was not able to see action, for it was only mustered into federal service on Armistice Day and would never leave the islands.

After the war, the entire National Guard unit was deactivated, then formally disbanded in 1921. Its officers were placed on the reserve list. It cost the Insular Government nearly 4.8 million pesos.

Air operations 
The Philippine National Guard included elements of the United States Army Air Service. Those selected were sent to train at the Curtiss School of Aviation, flying Curtiss Jennys.

See also 

 Philippine Department
 USS Rizal

Military History of Asian Americans
Military History of the Philippines
Military History of the United States

References

External links
 First Pinoys in Foreign Wars: The Filipino World War 1 Veterans

Military of the Philippines
Military history of the Philippines

National Guard (United States)
1917 establishments in the Philippines
1921 disestablishments